This is a list of airlines currently operating in Sudan.

See also
 List of defunct airlines of Sudan
 List of airports in Sudan
 List of companies based in Sudan
 List of air carriers banned in the European Union

Sudan
Airlines
Airlines
Sudan